The Open Contributors Corporation for Advanced Internet Development (OCCAID) is a non-profit consortium that operates one of the largest IPv6 research networks in the world.  It maintains both resale and facilities-based networks spanning 15,000 miles, with a presence in over 52 cities across 6 countries.

OCCAID facilitates collaboration between research communities and the carrier industry, serving as a testbed and proving ground for advanced Internet protocols.  Most of its participants connect to the network using Ethernet connections in areas where OCCAID has last-mile network connections.

OCCAID's primary collaboration activities have involved IPv6 and recently multicast protocols.  Both are relatively seldom-used Internet protocols; however they have potential for massive future adoption by many industry leaders.

External links
 Official site

IPv6
Computer network organizations